Oleksandr Oliynyk (born 31 October 1987) is a Ukrainian professional football coach and a former player.

Career
In 2015 Oliynyk played at least one game as defender for former Ukrainian club FC Okean Kerch that currently plays in the Crimean Premier League.

Oliynyk after retiring as footballer stayed in Kharkiv Oblast and became a manager within FC Kobra Kharkiv.

References

External links

1987 births
Living people
People from Izmail
Ukrainian footballers
Ukrainian expatriate footballers
Expatriate footballers in Moldova
Ukrainian football managers
FC Ros Bila Tserkva players
FC Dacia Chișinău players
FC Desna Chernihiv players
FC Krystal Kherson players
FC Olimpik Donetsk players
FC Enerhiya Mykolaiv players
FC Helios Kharkiv players
FC Okean Kerch players
Crimean Premier League players
Moldovan Super Liga players
PFC Sumy managers
Association football midfielders
Sportspeople from Odesa Oblast